39 Minutes of Bliss (In an Otherwise Meaningless World), first released in 2003, is a compilation album by the Swedish band Caesars created especially for the American and British markets. The name of the song "Suzy Creamcheese" comes from the artwork of the Frank Zappa album Freak Out!.

Track listing

Caesars
 César Vidal – lead vocals, guitar
 Joakim Åhlund – audio Production, guitar, mixing, producer, vocals
 Nino Keller – Drums, vocals
 David Lindquist – bass guitar

Singles

Jerk It Out

released April 7, 2003 on Virgin Records in the UK
CD DINSD244: "Jerk It Out" / "Out of my hands" / "She's A Planet"
7" DINS244: "Jerk It Out" / "Cannibals"
This single has been featured on Apples' iPod Shuffle advertisements, the British television series Teachers and on the video games "FIFA Football 2004", SSX 3, and Dance Dance Revolution SuperNOVA.

References

External links
Label website

Caesars (band) compilation albums
2003 compilation albums
Astralwerks compilation albums
Virgin Records compilation albums